Rolling Prairie is an unincorporated community located  between the towns of Oak Grove and Burnett in Dodge County, Wisconsin, United States.

Notable people
Lyman Linde, baseball player

Notes

Unincorporated communities in Wisconsin
Unincorporated communities in Dodge County, Wisconsin